Dominique Rollin (born 29 October 1982) is a Canadian former professional cyclist.

Born in Boucherville, Quebec, Rollin began his professional career in 2001 with the team Sympatico High Speed-Jet Fuel Coffee and again the following year, 2002 with Sympatico Edition Haute Vitese. He then spent three years in France racing as an elite amateur under director-sportif Guy Gallopin for the Roubaix team. After having issues with the way he was treated during Roubaix's transition to a professional team, he returned to North America to ride for the Kodakgallery.com - Sierra Nevada Brewing Co. team.

For 2008 Rollin joined the Toyota-United team, with whom he won the Rochester Omnium and the fourth stage of the Tour of California. He won the stage with a nearly seven-hour breakaway in a driving rainstorm, just holding off his fellow breakaway companions after attacking near the finish. Thanks to that performance, he grabbed the lead in the sprints classification and would defend the jersey successfully for the remainder of the race.

In 2009 he got his chance to join a major European professional team in the Swiss-based, Canadian-sponsored , with his best result of the year coming at the Scheldeprijs semi-classic where he reached the podium with a third place. In October 2010, he signed for two years with the ProTour team .

He was disqualified from the 2012 Giro d'Italia on the 20th stage for holding on to cars while he was unable to keep the pace.

Rollin initially retired from racing at the end of 2013 after being unable to secure a contract for the 2014 season. However, in August 2014  announced that they had signed Rollin alongside his former FDJ teammates Nacer Bouhanni and Geoffrey Soupe for 2015.

Career achievements

Major results

2005
 1st 1 stage Tour de Beauce

2006
 1st  National Road Race Championships
1st 1 stage Tour de Gironde

2007
3rd overall Tour of Missouri
 Pan American Games Time Trial

2008
 Tour of California
1st Stage 4
1st Sprints classification
1st Overall Rochester Omnium & 1 Stage
1st 1 stage Tour of Southland
2nd Overall Tour de Murrieta
9th Overall Tour of Missouri
 1st Mountains classification

2009
5th Profronde van Drenthe
3rd Scheldeprijs Vlaanderen

2010
 2nd Tour du Poitou-Charentes

2011
10th Dwars door Vlaanderen

2013
6th Cholet-Pays de Loire

Grand Tour general classification results timeline

References

External links 

 
 
 About Dominique Rollin
 Palmares on Cycling Base (French)

Living people
1982 births
Canadian male cyclists
Cyclists at the 2007 Pan American Games
Cyclists at the 2010 Commonwealth Games
People from Boucherville
Sportspeople from Quebec
Pan American Games medalists in cycling
Pan American Games bronze medalists for Canada
Medalists at the 2007 Pan American Games
Commonwealth Games competitors for Canada